Harvey Cable Garber (July 6, 1866 – March 23, 1938) was an American politician who served as a U.S. Representative from Ohio from 1903 to 1907.

Biography 
Harvey C. Garber was born in Hill Grove, Ohio on July 6, 1866. Garber moved to Greenville, Ohio, with his parents in 1872, where he attended public schools. He was later Manager of the Western Union Telegraph Co., and was Superintendent of the Central Union Telephone Co. for Ohio. He served four years as assistant general solicitor.

Garber served as member of the Ohio House of Representatives from 1890 to 1893. He served as chairman of the Democratic State committee in 1901 and chairman of the Democratic State executive committee from 1902 to 1908.

Garber was elected as a Democrat to the Fifty-eighth in 1902 and Fifty-ninth Congress in 1904. He was not a candidate for renomination in 1906.

Garber moved to Columbus, Ohio, in 1910 and served as assistant to the president of the Bell Telephone Co. in Ohio, Indiana, and Illinois from 1910 to 1915. Garber also studied law. He was admitted to the bar in 1921 and commenced practice in Columbus, Ohio.

Garber died at his winter home in Naples, Florida, March 23, 1938. He was interred in Greenville Cemetery, Greenville, Ohio.

Sources

1866 births
1938 deaths
Democratic Party members of the Ohio House of Representatives
People from Greenville, Ohio
Democratic Party members of the United States House of Representatives from Ohio